Puget Sound Community School (PSCS) is a small independent, secular middle and high school in Seattle, Washington. It was founded in 1994 by Andy Smallman and his wife Melinda Shaw.

Students at PSCS are required to be involved in school activities for a minimum of 1,000 hours per year. In order to graduate, a student must be at least 16 years old, have been enrolled at PSCS for at least three full years, and complete other requirements specific to their final year, such as completing a graduation project, or presenting a personal statement of belief to the community.
Daniel Pink's 2009 book Drive compares PSCS to Sudbury Valley School and Dennis Littky's Big Picture School, saying, "This tiny independent school in Seattle, Washington, gives its students a radical dose of autonomy, turning the 'one size fits all' approach of conventional schools on its head. Each student has an adviser who acts as her personal coach, helping her come up with her own learning goals."

In 2009, the Seattle Times featured the school in its article "Kindness Taught in Seattle School’s Online Class."

The New York Times featured PSCS in a 2017 article about non-binary youth.

References

External links

Private middle schools in Washington (state)
High schools in King County, Washington
Schools in Seattle
Private high schools in Washington (state)
1994 establishments in Washington (state)